was a village located in Tone District, northern Gunma Prefecture.

Geography
River ‐ 、

History
April 1, 1954 Merged with the town of Numata and the villages of Tonami, Usune, and Kawada to create the city of Numata.

Dissolved municipalities of Gunma Prefecture